Copernicia fallaensis is a palm which is endemic to Cuba.

References

fallaensis
Trees of Cuba